The 1860 United States presidential election in Missouri took place on November 2, 1860, as part of the 1860 United States presidential election. Voters chose nine representatives, or electors to the Electoral College, who voted for president and vice president.

Missouri was won by Democratic candidate, Stephen A. Douglas. He won the state by a very narrow margin of 0.26%. The state was the only one to fully give its votes to Douglas, though he would win the popular vote and three of the seven electoral votes from New Jersey under a fusion ticket.

, this is the last occasion when Putnam County, Ozark County, and Taney County voted for a candidate running as a Democrat, with the former voting for Douglas and the latter two voting for Breckinridge.

Results

See also
 United States presidential elections in Missouri

Notes

References

Missouri
1860
1860 Missouri elections